Isaiah Whaley (born March 26, 1998) is an American professional basketball player for the Greensboro Swarm of the NBA G League. He played college basketball for the UConn Huskies.

High school career
Whaley was ruled ineligible for his freshman season after transferring to Ashbrook High School in Gastonia, North Carolina. As a junior, he averaged 17.5 points, 9.1 rebounds and 4.7 blocks per game, leading his team to the Class 3A state title game. In September 2015, he was arrested for misdemeanor larceny with his cousin after a shoplifting incident. For his senior season, he moved to Evelyn Mack Academy in Charlotte, North Carolina. He played a postgraduate season at Mt. Zion Preparatory School in Baltimore, averaging 21 points, 11 rebounds and five blocks per game. A three-star recruit, Whaley committed to playing college basketball for UConn over offers from Providence, Seton Hall, Memphis and Georgia, among others.

College career
As a freshman at UConn, Whaley averaged 2.6 points and 2.2 rebounds per game. He suffered an ankle injury prior to his sophomore season and received limited playing time that year. As a junior, Whaley averaged six points, five rebounds and 1.5 blocks per game. He averaged eight points, 6.2 rebounds and 2.6 blocks per game as a senior, earning Big East Co-Defensive Player of the Year honors. Whaley opted to return to UConn for a fifth year. He was held out of a game against Michigan State on November 25, 2021, after fainting the previous day during a double-overtime win over Auburn.

Whaley was named to the American Athletic Conference's All-Academic Team for the 2018-2019 season. He received his Bachelor's degree in Urban and Community Studies in May 2021 and pursued graduate studies during the 2021-2022 academic year.

Professional career

Greensboro Swarm (2022–present)
Whaley signed with the Charlotte Hornets on June 24, 2022, on an Exhibit 10 contract. On October 6, 2022, he was waived by the Hornets. On October 23, it was announced that he had been added to the training camp roster of the Greensboro Swarm. On November 4, 2022, he was named to the opening night roster for the Greensboro Swarm.

Career statistics

College

|-
| style="text-align:left;"| 2017–18
| style="text-align:left;"| UConn
| 30 || 12 || 13.8 || .558 || – || .679 || 2.2 || .3 || .4 || 1.0 || 2.6
|-
| style="text-align:left;"| 2018–19
| style="text-align:left;"| UConn
| 23 || 0 || 3.6 || .667 || – || .333 || 1.0 || .0 || .1 || .2 || .8
|-
| style="text-align:left;"| 2019–20
| style="text-align:left;"| UConn
| 30 || 6 || 18.8 || .540 || – || .733 || 5.0 || .6 || .6 || 1.5 || 6.0
|-
| style="text-align:left;"| 2020–21
| style="text-align:left;"| UConn
| 23 || 23 || 27.6 || .479 || .348 || .469 || 6.2 || 1.5 || 1.0 || 2.6 || 8.0
|- class="sortbottom"
| style="text-align:center;" colspan="2"| Career
| 106 || 41 || 16.0 || .518 || .348 || .628 || 3.6 || .6 || .5 || 1.3 || 4.3

References

External links
UConn Huskies bio

1998 births
Living people
American men's basketball players
Basketball players from North Carolina
Greensboro Swarm players
People from Gastonia, North Carolina
Power forwards (basketball)
UConn Huskies men's basketball players